John M. Bolton (October 5, 1901 – July 9, 1936) was an American businessman and politician in Chicago.

Biography
Bolton was born in Chicago and attended Chicago public schools. He was in the floral business and insurance business. A Democrat, he was first elected to the Illinois House of Representatives, representing the Second District, in the fall of 1930, taking office in early 1931. He was re-elected in 1932, and in 1934 (unopposed).

Bolton was shot to death following a car chase in Chicago shortly after midnight on July 9, 1936. The Associated Press reported that he may have been assassinated by organized crime figures due to his efforts to legalize some forms of betting, and the Chicago Tribune attributed his death to "gangsters" in a page-one story. The Tribune also published photos of Bolton's car, which had crashed at Washtenaw Avenue and Harrison Street, and noted that Bolton had a brother who had been a prohibition gangster. A follow-up story by the United Press reported that Bolton may have been killed because he was unsuccessful in helping some prisoners in the Joliet Penitentiary get parole. Bolton was buried at All Saints Cemetery in Chicago. His assailants were not caught and remain unknown.

Bolton was married and had two foster children at the time of his death.

References

1901 births
1936 deaths
1936 murders in the United States
20th-century American politicians
20th-century American businesspeople
Politicians from Chicago
Businesspeople from Chicago
Democratic Party members of the Illinois House of Representatives
People murdered in Illinois
Male murder victims
Assassinated American politicians
Deaths by firearm in Illinois
Unsolved murders in the United States
Assassinated American State House representatives